This is a list of the largest companies from the Nordic countries, as determined by different factors. There are several ways of ranking companies, be it by revenue, income, market value or number of employees. Arguably, the most complete list, is the annual Forbes Global 2000 list, a ranking based on four metrics. Of note, IKEA Group, with $37.6 billion in annual revenue and $4.8 billion in annual profit, is not included on the Forbes Global 2000 list.

Largest Nordic companies according to Forbes 
The Forbes Global 2000 published on 18 April 2012 is a ranking of largest companies in the world, by a mix of four metrics: sales, profits, assets and market value. The ranking number shows the ranking among all other Nordic companies on the list, while the number displayed within parenthesis shows the actual ranking among all the companies on the Forbes Global 2000 list.

The ranking is based on the most recent available annual reports, as of April 2012. As a consequence, the data is most likely based on 2011 annual reports and market values are most likely those of April 2012 (unless otherwise noted).
Furthermore, the ranking does not take privately  or state-owned enterprises into account.

Divided by country 
To put a perspective on the differences between the number of companies in the Nordic nations, this list shows the annual number of companies from a given nation, that made the list. Note that Iceland is no longer represented, primarily because of the 2008–2012 Icelandic financial crisis in which several banks collapsed.

Largest employers 
This is a list of the largest employers in the Nordic nations, based on the most recent annual reports. Both private and public companies are represented on the list, though public employers are not. IKEA would rank 4 on this list with its 123,000 employees, had its official headquarters been in Sweden instead of in the Netherlands.

References 

 

+
+
Lists of largest private companies by country